The Apostolic Vicariate (or Vicariate Apostolic) of Méndez is a missionary circonsciption of the Roman Catholic Church.
 
Its cathedral see, Catedral Purísima de Macas, is located in the city of Macas in Ecuador's Morona-Santiago province. It is exempt, i.e. directly subject to the Holy See, not part of any ecclesiastical province.

History 
On 17 February 1893 Pope Leo XIII established the Vicariate Apostolic of Méndez y Gualaquiza from the Vicariate Apostolic of Napo. 
 
Pope Pius XII shortened its name to the Vicariate Apostolic of Méndez on 12 April 1951.

Bishops

Incumbent Ordinaries 
So far, all its apostolic vicars were members of the missionary Salesians order (S.D.B.)

Apostolic vicars of Méndez y Gualaquiza
 Santiago (Giacomo) Costamagna, S.D.B. † 1921 (18 March 1895 – 1919)
 Domenico Comin, S.D.B. (1920.03.05 – 1951.04.12 cfr. infra

Apostolic vicars of Méndez 
 Domenico Comin, S.D.B. (cfr. supra''; 1951.04.12 – 1963.08.17)
 José Félix Pintado Blasco, S.D.B. † (17 Aug. 1963 – 24 Jan. 1981)
 Teodoro Luis Arroyo Robelly, S.D.B. † (24 Jan. 1981 – 1 July 1993)
 Pietro Gabrielli, S.D.B. (1 July 1993 – 15 April 2008)
 Néstor Montesdeoca Becerra, S.D.B. (15 Apr 2008 – present)

Coadjutor Vicar Apostolic
 José Félix Pintado Blasco, S.D.B. † (13 Nov 1958 - 17 Aug. 1963)

See also 
 Roman Catholicism in Ecuador

References 

Apostolic vicariates
Roman Catholic dioceses in Ecuador
Religious organizations established in 1893
1893 establishments in South America